"Rame" is a rare word in English which means branch. Rame is also the name of two villages in Cornwall:

Rame may also refer to:

Geography
 Rame, Maker-with-Rame, in southeast Cornwall
Rame Head, a coastal headland near the first of these, as well as the Rame Peninsula
 Rame, Wendron, towards the southwest of Cornwall
Rame, Estonia, village in Hanila Parish, Lääne County, Estonia
Rame Head (Victoria) in Australia
Rameh, a village in Northern Israel
Rama (Gaul), an ancient town in Gaul near La Roche-de-Rame

Other
Rame (album)
Rame, a single by German eurodance group Snap!
Rame, the name of a fictional alien race created by Redmond A. Simonsen for the science fiction board wargaming titles Starforce: Alpha Centauri and StarSoldier, published by Simulations Publications, Inc. copyrights 1974 and 1977 respectively.
RAME, the newsgroup rec.arts.movies.erotica and website rame.net, creator and host of the Internet Adult Film Database